The 1991 Australia rugby union tour of New Zealand consisted of two matches played by the Wallabies in August 1991.

This tour was made two weeks after the New Zealand tour of Australia. The Wallabies lost the only test with the All Blacks.

The Matches
Scores and results list Australia's points tally first.

Test Team
Manager: John Breen
Coach: Bob Dwyer
Captain: Nick Farr-Jones 
Michael Lynagh
David Campese
Tim Horan
Jason Little
Bob Egerton
Marty Roebuck
Troy Coker	
Viliami Ofahengaue
Simon Poidevin
John Eales
Rod McCall
Ewen McKenzie	
Phil Kearns
Tony Daly

References 

Australia national rugby union team tours of New Zealand
Tour
tour
August 1991 sports events in New Zealand